PyCBC is an open source software package primarily written in the Python programming language which is designed for use in gravitational-wave astronomy and gravitational-wave data analysis. PyCBC contains modules for signal processing, FFT, matched filtering, gravitational waveform generation, among other tasks common in gravitational-wave data analysis.

The software is developed by the gravitational-wave community alongside LIGO and Virgo scientists to analyze gravitational-wave data, search for gravitational-waves, and to measure the properties of astrophysical sources. It has been used to analyze gravitational-wave data from the LIGO and Virgo observatories to detect gravitational-waves from the mergers of neutron stars and black holes and determine their statistical significance. PyCBC based analyses can integrate with the Open Science Grid for large scale computing resources. Software based on PyCBC has been used to rapidly analyze gravitational-wave data for astronomical follow-up.

See also 
 List of numerical analysis software
 LIGO Scientific Collaboration
 European Gravitational Observatory

References

External links 
 
 GitHub repository

Physics software
Astronomy software
Free and open-source software
Astronomy